Thubana quadrata is a moth in the family Lecithoceridae. It was described by Kyu-Tek Park and Fatimah Abang in 2005. It is found on Borneo.

References

Moths described in 2005
Thubana